Nuuksio (Finnish) or Noux (Swedish) is a district of Espoo, a city in Finland, best known for the Nuuksio National Park. The Solvalla Sports Institute is also located in Nuuksio.

Etymology 
The  Finnish name, Nuuksio, comes from the Swedish name, Noux, an old name which has had many forms, such as Noox (1540), Noosis (1541), Nooxby (1552) and Nowx (1556). The name has been thought to have been derived from the Sámi word njukča, meaning swan.

See also 
 Röylä
 Vanha-Nuuksio
 Districts of Espoo

References 

Districts of Espoo